Contact dance may refer to:

Contact improvisation, a form of dance improvisation
Lap dance, a type of sex work